Turkmenistan has participated in the Turkvision Song Contest once: in , when Turkmenistan was represented by the song "Shikga-Shikga bilerzik" performed by Züleyha Kakayeva. The song placed 5th in the final with 192 points.

History

2013 

Turkmenistan was announced in 2013 as one of 20 countries and regions taking part in the first contest in Turkey, however on 17 December 2013 Turkmenistan was announced as no longer participating alongside Russia, Chuvashia and Xinjiang.

2014 

Turkmenistan made their debut in the Turkvision Song Contest at the 2014 festival, in Kazan, Tatarstan. Their participation was announced six days before the contest was due to take place, Züleyha Kakayeva was selected internally to represent Turkmenistan.

2015 

Mary, Turkmenistan was announced as the host city of the  contest in November 2014. However, the host city was changed to Istanbul, Turkey in August 2015.

Participation overview

Related involvement

Jury members

References 

 
Countries in the Turkvision Song Contest